Sarah Jama  is a Canadian politician and disability rights activist who has served as the member of Provincial Parliament (MPP) for Hamilton Centre since 2023 as a member of the Ontario New Democratic Party (NDP). Prior to her election to the Legislative Assembly, she was the executive director and co-founder of Disability Justice Network Ontario.

Background
Jama was born with cerebral palsy and uses a wheelchair for mobility. After graduating from McMaster University with a social science degree, Jama settled in Hamilton, Ontario.

Activism
Jama co-founded the Disability Justice Network Ontario in September 2018. She appeared before the Senate of Canada's legal and constitutional affairs committee in February 2021 to argue against the proposed Bill C-7, which she said made euthanasia more accessible for people with mental health disabilities, rather than providing mental health supports.

In early 2021, she cofounded the Hamilton Encampment Support Network, focusing on affordable housing access. That same year, Jama received media attention when she was arrested in Hamilton while at a protest against homeless encampment evictions in the city. She was accused of obstructing and assault of a police officer. Charges were later withdrawn after she entered into a peace bond.

Politics
In July 2022, Jama announced that she would seek the NDP nomination in the Hamilton Centre by-election, after former MPP and NDP leader Andrea Horwath resigned to run for mayor. Jama was acclaimed as the NDP candidate in October 2022. Jama's campaign garnered controversy after her statements describing Israel as an apartheid state resurfaced, leading to a request by B'nai Brith Canada for the NDP to drop her as a candidate. She later apologized for her statements.

On March 16, 2023, Jama was elected as the MPP for Hamilton Centre in a landslide, garnering 54.28 per cent of the vote.

Electoral record

2023 Hamilton Centre provincial by-election

References

External links

Ontario New Democratic Party MPPs
21st-century Canadian politicians
21st-century Canadian women politicians
Living people
Women MPPs in Ontario
Canadian disability rights activists
1990s births
Black Canadian politicians
Canadian politicians with disabilities
Black Canadian women
People with cerebral palsy
McMaster University alumni
Politicians from Hamilton, Ontario